The State Theatre, Košice is situated in the centre of Košice, Slovakia.

The representative building of the State Theatre was built in a Neo-baroque style according to projects of Adolf Lang during the years 1879–1899.

The interior of the theatre is richly decorated with plaster ornaments. The stage is lyre-shaped. The ceiling of the building is decorated with scenes from William Shakespeare's plays Othello, Romeo and Juliet, King Lear and A Midsummer Night's Dream.

References

External links
 Official website of The State Theatre Košice

Buildings and structures in Košice
Theatres in Košice
Opera houses in Slovakia
Tourist attractions in Košice
Theatres completed in 1899
1899 establishments in Austria-Hungary